South Kanara (North) Lok Sabha constituency was a former Lok Sabha constituency in Madras State.  This seat came into existence in 1951. With the implementation of States Reorganisation Act, 1956, it ceased to exist.

Assembly segments
South Kanara (North) Lok Sabha constituency comprised the following five Legislative Assembly segments:
 Udipi (Udupi)
 Brahmavar
 Coondapur (Kundapur)
 Karkal
 Mulky (Mulki)

After South Canara District of erstwhile Madras State got merged with Mysore State in 1956, this seat ceased to exist and was replaced by Udipi Lok Sabha constituency.

Later in 1978, the Legislative Assembly segments of Baindur, Kundapur, Brahmavar, Udupi, and Kaup were in Udupi district, and the Legislative Assembly constituencies of Moodabidri, Surathkal and Bantwal were in Dakshina Kannada district. After delimitation in 2008, Baindur became part of Shimoga constituency and Brahmavar ceased to exist.

Members of Parliament 

Madras State: (as South Kanara (North))
1952: Ullal Srinivas Mallya, Indian National Congress
 With the implementation of States Reorganisation Act, 1956, it ceased to exist.
 For information after 1956, see : Udupi Lok Sabha

Notes

See also
 Dakshina Kannada district
 Kasaragod Lok Sabha constituency
 List of former constituencies of the Lok Sabha
 South Kanara (South) Lok Sabha constituency
 Udupi Lok Sabha constituency
 Udupi Chikmagalur Lok Sabha constituency
 Udupi district

Udupi district
Dakshina Kannada district
Politics of Kasaragod district
Former constituencies of the Lok Sabha
1956 disestablishments in India
Constituencies disestablished in 1956
South Kanara District
Former Lok Sabha constituencies of Karnataka